Timothy Edward Manning (December 3, 1853 – June 11, 1934) was an English professional baseball player who played mostly as a second baseman in Major League Baseball from  to . He began his career with the Providence Grays in 1882.  After his first season, he then played two full seasons, and one partial season for the Baltimore Orioles, before returning to the Grays in his final season.    Manning died at the age of 80 in Oak Park, Illinois, and is interred at the Calvary Cemetery in Evanston, Illinois.

References

External links

Tim Manning's career minor league statistics

1853 births
1934 deaths
Burials in Illinois
Major League Baseball second basemen
Major League Baseball players from the United Kingdom
Major League Baseball players from England
English baseball players
19th-century baseball players
Providence Grays players
Baltimore Orioles (AA) players
People from Henley-on-Thames
Sportspeople from Oxfordshire
Minor league baseball managers
San Francisco Athletics players
Philadelphia Phillies (minor league) players
Brooklyn Grays (Interstate Association) players
Toronto (minor league baseball) players
Augusta Browns players
Memphis Grays players
Birmingham Ironmakers players
Kansas City Cowboys (minor league) players
Manchester Maroons players
Kalamazoo Kazoos players
Flint Flyers players
Aurora (minor league baseball) players
Joliet Giants players
Aurora Maroons players